Kasson Crooker is an American electronic musician, a composer, and the artist behind Symbion Project, his solo moniker. His past bands are Freezepop, Splashdown, Larkspur, and Sirensong. DJ HMX, Komputer Kontroller, and Cosmonaut Zero were alias bands of Crooker used only for the videogames FreQuency and Amplitude.

Music career
In 1999, Crooker formed the synthpop group Freezepop with Liz Enthusiasm and Sean T. Drinkwater. While in the band he went by various aliases, starting as The Duke of Candied Apples, then briefly being known as The Duke of Belgian Waffles, and finally The Duke of Pannenkoeken. In September 2009, Kasson retired from Freezepop to focus his efforts on his work at Harmonix. He has made several guest appearances at Freezepop concerts since then, often also playing a Symbion Project set.

His main solo project is Symbion Project, with seven releases: Red (1998), Immortal Game (2003), Wound Up by God or the Devil (2006), Misery in Soliloquy (2009), Contrapasso (2011), Arcadian (2016), and Saturnine (2022). Several of his songs are featured in Johannes Grenzfurthner's films Die Gstettensaga: The Rise of Echsenfriedl, Traceroute and Glossary of Broken Dreams.

His other former bands include the dreampop band Sirensong and the more well-known Splashdown, whose albums include Stars and Garters, Halfworld (EP), Redshift (EP), and the unreleased full-length albums Blueshift (which was completed but never released by Capitol Records) and Possibilities (an album of remixes and demos).

In April 2017, Crooker teamed with Micah Knapp and Avielle Heath to create a 360 Virtual Reality music video for a single off of "Arcadian".

Video game development
Crooker was also a project director at video game developer Harmonix and was the project lead on Phase, Rock Band 2, Dance Central, and Dance Central 2 for Kinect/Xbox360. The music of Symbion Project and Freezepop has been featured in the Harmonix PlayStation 2 games FreQuency, Amplitude, the Karaoke Revolution series, Guitar Hero, Guitar Hero 2, Phase, Rock Band; the InCog-developed Downhill Domination; and one of the North American Dance Dance Revolution games developed by Konami, which publishes Karaoke Revolution. He and Eric Brosius took home the 2006 Game Developers Choice Award for Best Audio for their work on Guitar Hero.

References

External links
 Symbion Project Official Website
 Facebook
 Twitter
 Soundcloud
 Bandcamp (CD Store)
 Official website of Freezepop
 Nashville Review interview with Kasson Crooker

American electronic musicians
Living people
Freezepop members
Keytarists
Year of birth missing (living people)